Malomaksyutovo (Bäläkäy Mäqsüt) is a rural locality (a village) in Sayranovsky Selsoviet, Ishimbaysky District, Bashkortostan, Russia. The population was 207 as of 2010. There are 5 streets.

Geography 
Malomaksyutovo is located 25 km southeast of Ishimbay (the district's administrative centre) by road. Kashalakbash is the nearest rural locality.

References 

Rural localities in Ishimbaysky District
Ufa Governorate